Lien Thikeo is a Laotian politician. He was Minister of Finance from 2014 to 2016.

References

Living people
Lao People's Revolutionary Party politicians
Year of birth missing (living people)
Finance Ministers of Laos
Members of the 9th Central Committee of the Lao People's Revolutionary Party
Members of the 10th Central Committee of the Lao People's Revolutionary Party